Guilandina is a genus of flowering plants in the legume family, Fabaceae. It belongs to the subfamily Caesalpinioideae and tribe Caesalpinieae.

The genus was named after Melchior Wieland (1515–1589), a Prussian naturalist who "Italianized" his name as "Guilandini" upon moving to Italy.

Species
The genus Guilandina comprises the following species:
 Guilandina barkeriana (Urb. & Ekman) Britton (Cuba, Haiti)
 Guilandina bonduc L. 1753 – grey nicker, knicker nut (pantropical)
 Guilandina caymanensis (Millsp.) Britton & Rose (Cayman Islands)
 Guilandina ciliata Bergius ex Wikstrom – broadpad nicker (Caribbean)
 Guilandina culebrae Britton & Wilson ex Britton & Rose – smooth yellow nicker (Puerto Rico)
 Guilandina glaucophylla (Urb.) Britton & Rose (Cuba, Swan Islands)
 Guilandina intermedia (Urb.) Britton & Rose (Cuba, Jamaica)
 Guilandina major (DC.) Small – yellow nicker (pantropical)
 Guilandina portoricensis Britton & Wilson – brown nicker (Puerto Rico)
 Guilandina sphaerosperma (Urb. & Ekman) Britton (Hispaniola)
 Guilandina urophylla (Donn. Sm.) Britton & Rose (Costa Rica)
 Guilandina wrightiana (Urb.) Britton & Rose (Cayman Islands, Cuba, Jamaica)

The following species also belong to the genus Guilandina but  have not yet been formally transferred:
 Caesalpinia delphinensis Du Puy & Rabev.
 Caesalpinia homblei R. Wilczek
 Caesalpinia minax Hance
 Caesalpinia murifructa Gillis & Proctor
 Caesalpinia solomonensis Hattink
 Caesalpinia volkensii Harms

References

External links
 

Caesalpinieae
Fabaceae genera